is a Shinto shrine in Kanazawa, Ishikawa, Japan.

The shrine was established in 1599, dedicated to Maeda Toshiie (the first lord of Kaga Domain), in Utatsu-yama (卯辰山), east of Kanazawa. It was moved to its present location in 1873 and renamed to Oyama-jinja. The main gate was constructed in 1875. This gate is a peculiar mix of traditional Japanese, Chinese, and European religious architectural elements. The third floor is particular famous for its Dutch stained-glass windows. It is said that the third floor was also used as a lighthouse. The gate was designated an Important Cultural Asset on August 29, 1950.

References

External links

 Oyama Jinja Shrine Kanazawa City Tourism Association
Beppyo shrines

Religious buildings and structures completed in 1599
1599 establishments in Japan
Religious organizations established in the 1590s
Shinto shrines in Ishikawa Prefecture
Buildings and structures in Kanazawa, Ishikawa
Giyōfū architecture